Sigła  is a village in the administrative district of Gmina Aleksandrów, within Biłgoraj County, Lublin Voivodeship, in eastern Poland.

The village has a population of 15.

References

Villages in Biłgoraj County